A pastoral charge (from the word pastor), in Methodist churches, consists of one or more congregations under the spiritual leadership of a minister or ministry team. In the United Methodist Church a charge is organized under and subject to the Book of Discipline, with a single governing body called a charge conference, to which a minister is appointed as pastor in charge. Charges are different from  churches or congregations as they may encompass more than one church or congregation. This stems from the early days of Methodism in the United States and Canada, when multiple congregations were served by single ministers acting as circuit riders, riding on horseback between the sometimes far-flung congregations in their charge.

See also
Governance of the British Methodist Church

References

United Methodist Church
United Church of Canada